Walk the Dark Street is a 1956 American film noir B-movie directed by Wyott Ordung and starring Chuck Connors.

Plot summary 

Dan (Don Ross) returns to L.A. having fought in the Korean War. He meets with Frank (Chuck Connors) the brother of Tommy who was one of the men killed under Dan's command. Tommy wasn't happy at being passed over for promotion and wrote to his brother to say that if he died Dan would be to blame.

Frank explains to Dan that his heart condition means he can no longer go big game hunting and makes him a lucrative offer to have a ‘hunt’ in L.A. with both men armed only with camera guns. Unbeknownst to Dan, Frank replaces his camera round with a live bullet and plans to kill him in revenge for his brother's death.

The two men engage in a two-day game of cat and mouse which is complicated by the involvement of Tommy's fiancée and a mix up at a sports shop. As the men finally get each other in their sights who will win and who will die?

Cast 
Chuck Connors as Frank Garrick
Don Ross as Dan Lawton
Regina Gleason as Helen Leyden
Eddie Kafafian as Sergeant Tommy Garrick
Fred Darian as Nightclub Singer
Vonne Godfrey as Frank's French Girlfriend
Ewing Brown as 2nd Sporting Goods Clerk
 Maxwell Lauer as Background Employee

External links 

1956 films
American crime drama films
1956 crime drama films
American black-and-white films
Films scored by Paul Dunlap
1950s English-language films
1950s American films